The hydrophilic–lipophilic balance (HLB) of a surfactant is a measure of its degree of hydrophilicity or lipophilicity, determined by calculating percentages of molecular weights for the hydrophilic and lipohilic portions of the surfactant molecule, as described by Griffin in 1949 and 1954. Other methods have been suggested, notably in 1957 by Davies.

Griffin's method
Griffin's method for non-ionic surfactants as described in 1954 works as follows:

where  is the molecular mass of the hydrophilic portion of the molecule, and M is the molecular mass of the whole molecule, giving a result on a scale of 0 to 20.
An HLB value of 0 corresponds to a completely lipophilic/hydrophobic molecule, and a value of 20 corresponds to a completely hydrophilic/lipophobic molecule.

The HLB value can be used to predict the surfactant properties of a molecule:
 < 10 : Lipid-soluble (water-insoluble)
 > 10 : Water-soluble (lipid-insoluble)
 1 to 3: anti-foaming agent
 3 to 6: W/O (water in oil) emulsifier
 7 to 9: wetting and spreading agent
 13 to 16: detergent
 8 to 16: O/W (oil in water) emulsifier
 16 to 18: solubiliser or hydrotrope

Davies' method 

In 1957, Davies suggested a method based on calculating a value based on the chemical groups of the molecule. The advantage of this method is that it takes into account the effect of stronger and weaker hydrophilic groups.  The method works as follows:

where:

 - Number of hydrophilic groups in the molecule

 - Value of the th hydrophilic groups (see tables)

  - Number of lipophilic groups in the molecule

References

Surfactants